Stanislav Igolinsky (born 1954, in Saratov) is a Russian pianist.

In 1971 he finished Magnet musical school at the Leningrad Conservatory in class of Volf M.V. (piano) and in class of Volfenzon S.J. (composition). In 1976 Igolinsky graduated from the Moscow State Conservatory, and then from the Postgraduate study-training in class of Professor Voskresensky M.S. 
In 1972 Igolinsky took the 1 prize at the Fourth All-Union competition of pianists in Minsk. In 1974 he received the 2 premium at the Fifth International competition named after Tchaikovsky in Moscow. In 1975 he took the 2 prize at the International competition named after Queen Elizabeth in Brussels.
Stanislav Igolinsky gave concerts almost in 200 cities of CIS, and also in Belgium, Holland, Austria, Switzerland, Japan, Czechoslovakia, Finland, Germany, Hungary, Poland, Bulgaria, Romania, Yugoslavia, Spain, and Taiwan. He acted with such well-known conductors as Svetlanov, Gergiyev, Kitayenko, Katz, Dmitriyev, Janson, Domarkas, Sondetskis, Sinaisky, Dimitriadi, Kersies, Hofman, Oberfrank, Segestriom, Stryia, Bentsi, Zanderling, Beloglavek. In repertoire of him are the works of Bach, Haydn, Mozart, Beethoven (almost all sonatas), Schubert, Schuman, 
Liszt, Chopin (almost all works), Brahms, Grieg, Debussy, Ravel, Musorgsky, Tchaikovsky, Rachmaninov, Skryabin, Prokofiev, Shostakovich, more than 30 concerts for piano with orchestra, piano quartets and quintets, sonatas for violin and piano. The pianist also acts with the violinist Vladislav Igolinsky, with the State quartet after the name of Taneyev. From 1979 till 2000 Stanislav Igolinsky was the soloist of St.-Petersburg-Concert. From 1984 till 1991, from 2002 till 2005 he taught at the St.-Petersburg Conservatory. Since 2005 Igolinsky works as a Doctor at the Moscow State Conservatory. Now Dr. Igolinsky gives the master-classes, participates in work of jury of the Russian and international piano competitions.   
He embarked in an international concert career once he graduated from the Moscow State Conservatory (1976). A former teacher at the St. Petersburg Conservatory, Igolinsky is since 2005 a Doctor in Moscow's. He is a People's Artist of Russia.

References

External links 
 Almaty Piano Competition
 Piano Division of the Moscow Conservatory

1953 births
Living people
Russian classical pianists
Male classical pianists
Prize-winners of the Queen Elisabeth Competition
21st-century classical pianists
21st-century Russian male musicians